Jordan Belchos (born June 22, 1989) is a Canadian speed skater. He primarily skates in the long distances of 1500 m, 5000 m and 10 000 m, as well as the mass start event. He won medals at the World Cup level and finished third at the 2012–13 ISU Speed Skating Mass Start World Cup.

Career

2015 Pan American Games
At the 2015 Pan American Games in Toronto, Canada, Belchos won a bronze medal in inline speed skating.

2018 Winter Olympics
Belchos qualified to compete for Canada at the 2018 Winter Olympics.

References

External links

1989 births
Living people
Canadian male speed skaters
Inline speed skaters
Olympic speed skaters of Canada
Speed skaters at the 2018 Winter Olympics
Speed skaters at the 2022 Winter Olympics
Pan American Games medalists in roller skating
Pan American Games bronze medalists for Canada
Roller speed skaters at the 2015 Pan American Games
World Single Distances Speed Skating Championships medalists
Sportspeople from Toronto
Medalists at the 2015 Pan American Games
21st-century Canadian people